Eulalio Avila (born 8 September 1941) is a Mexican basketball player. He competed in the men's tournament at the 1960 Summer Olympics and the 1964 Summer Olympics.

References

External links
 

1941 births
Living people
Mexican men's basketball players
1967 FIBA World Championship players
Olympic basketball players of Mexico
Basketball players at the 1960 Summer Olympics
Basketball players at the 1964 Summer Olympics
Sportspeople from Ciudad Juárez
Basketball players from Chihuahua